Water For People was founded in 1991 by the American Water Works Association (AWWA) as a response to the increasing water scarcity in developing countries. It is a nonprofit international development organization that helps people in rural parts of developing countries achieve greater access to drinkable and potable water and sanitation facilities. It works to accomplish the United Nations' 6th Sustainable Development Goal: availability of clean water and sanitation and comprehensive monitoring of freshwater facilities for the progression of human health. They seek to address the issue of nonexistent and suboptimal water and sanitation facilities across less-developed countries. With developing locally sustainable drinking water resources and sanitation facilities, Water For People also works to bring health and hygiene education programs to local districts. The non-governmental organization also works to empower and involve local governments, corporations, schools, homes, and individuals in the construction, financing, and maintenance of the water infrastructure. Water For People has established a year-round presence in 30 districts of nine developing countries, including Guatemala, Honduras, Nicaragua, Bolivia, Peru, India, Rwanda, Uganda and Malawi. In totality, Water For People reaches 4 million people.

Volunteering

Water For People depends on volunteers to fulfill much of its mission. Volunteers raise funds and spread the word about the desperate need for safe drinking water and improved sanitation in the developing world.  Their main goal is to improve the access to safe and clean water for developing countries around the world.  They provide programs that ensure running sanitized water to prevent water-related illnesses in poorer countries.

The World Water Corps is Water For People's volunteer program that sends engineers to the countries where the sanitation projects are being established. This allows the volunteers to use their skills and experience in support of the development of sustainable safe drinking water resources, improved sanitation facilities, and hygiene education programs.

World Water Corps volunteers provide professional support to Water For People's work overseas within the parameters of its specifically-tailored community-based models. As such, they are not involved with the actual design of the water and sanitation systems. This function is left to local government and nongovernmental organization partners, as well as community members themselves, who must take ownership of this system and understand how to operate and maintain them for the long term. Water For People works with local partners and stakeholders to assist rural governments, schools, businesses, and households in emptying septic tanks, installing pumps, wells, and toilets with the proper technology and management strategies to guarantee the durability and sustained functionality of innovations. The organization also collaborates with rural members and local institutions to make sure that sanitary napkin containers and other sanitary services are available for women. Rainwater catchment systems are placed on school properties, gardens are established at hand pumps, trees are planted to increase recharge, deep boreholes are motorized, and water treatment systems are installed.

World Water Corps volunteers engage in such activities as data-testing and mapping to provide baseline data for development, monitoring the functionality of past projects, and evaluating overall program effectiveness. Volunteers have conducted scoping studies and needs assessments to determine where Water For People should expand. They might also be called upon to "train the trainers" abroad or provide technical assistance to partners. World Water Corps uses an advanced computer program, Akvo Flow, to monitor and acquire data to measure and calculate data regarding the water quality, pressure, and concentration in the constructed infrastructures. Akvo Flow conducts intensive handheld data and survey collection using visual map-based reporting tools, web-based dashboards, field-level monitoring, integrated GPS, and custom adaptive surveys. Water For People partners with Akvo to routinely collect, analyze, and report information on water and mineral quality as well as water pressure and flow from aqueducts and nearby bodies of water. Water For People closely monitors and assesses its program outcomes for at least one decade, post-installation, to keep account of its sustainable outcomes and to monitor how local service authorities are managing the infrastructure.

Funding and Spending 
Water For People's global strategic partners are the Conrad N. Hilton Foundation, Osprey Foundation, LDS Charities, The Rick and Nancy Moskovitz Foundation, and charity: water. These foundations are its biggest patrons who contribute each over one million dollars continuously. According to the NGO's website, it requires local governments to fund some of the infrastructural development in the community that the government oversees. This allows for the local governments to take ownership of the development taking place in their home districts and allows for the NGO to build long-term and trusted relationships with the local authorities. The organization engages in co-investing/financing, in which the Water For People mandates local governments and businesses to invest in the sustainable outcomes that are beneficial to them. The NGO works with local recipients in deciding the most effective plan for a given community and executing the project together.

According to Charity Navigator, the organization is listed as an independent auxiliary, and is not financially affiliated or involved with IRS group ruling with a national, regional, or geographic grouping of organizations. Based on the 2016 financial report from the NGO website, 46% of their proceeds came from foundations, 17% came from private individuals, 4% from In-Kind donation, 7% from committees, 6% from workplace giving, 14% from corporations, 1% from special events, and 5% from other non-governmental-related donors. The organization's website states that it does not receive any money from any type of government entity. Charity Navigator verifies this claim as well. According to the 2016 IRS tax form on the NGO's website, they received $20,077,450 in total revenue. Charity Navigator confirms this exact amount, but it goes further to detail that of that amount, $19,239,732 came from contributions, gifts, and grants, $407,327 came from federated campaigns, $206,054 came from fundraising events, $224,337 came from other revenue. For 2015, Guidestar recorded that the NGO received $19,045,856. However, in Water For People's 2015 IRS tax form, it states that the NGO received $18,950,814. This is conflicting in that Water For People's IRS documents are official, however, Guidestar recorder numerical values that do not coincide with the IRS tax forms.

However, since much of the gathered financial information presented here comes from the NGO's official website, it raises skepticism as to whether or not external sources buy into the organization's self-advocacy for the transparency of its funding and expenditure patterns. According to Charity Navigator using Water For People's most recent IRS 990 form from 2016, 79.1% of all its revenue in the fiscal year went towards program expenses and services that it delivers.10.9% of the money went towards administrative expenses, 9.9% went toward fundraising expenditures. According to the 2016 financial report from the actual website of Water For People, 79% was spent on programs, 11% spent on administration, and 10% spent on funding. Charity Navigator also conducts fundraising efficiency percentages, which accounts for the amount of money spent to raise $1 in charitable contributions. Based on this calculation, the NGO's fundraising efficiency was $0.09. Charity Navigator also conducts a working capital ratio score, which measures the number of years a charity can sustain its level of spending using its net available assets or working capital, from its most recent IRS tax form. Water For People got a score of 0.58 years. Water For People got a score of 15.6% for its liabilities to assets score, which measures the financial capacity and sustainability of the NGO looking at the proportion of their total liabilities to their total assets. Charity Navigator reports the NGO's total expenditures in 2016 as $19,889,740. Of this total, $1,992,727 went towards administrative expenses, $1,944,248 towards fundraising costs, and $15,952,765 was invested into their programs. Its deficit was $187,710 and net assets was $10,351,207.  On the NGO's website, on its IRS 990 tax form, the only numbers that differ from Charity Navigator are the administrative expenses, which are $6,616,063, and the program costs, which are $11,727,731. From 2015, Guidestar reported that Water For People spent a total of $17,115,127, in which out of this amount, $13,330,044 went towards programs, $1,974,794 went to administrative costs, and $1,810,289 went to fundraising. Water For People reported in its 2015 IRS tax form that it spent a total of $18,844,346, in which $5,819,735 in administration, and $1,944,288 in fundraising. There's a discrepancy here. On Water For People's website, they have all their audited financial statements from 2005 to 2015. They also have all their IRS Form 990s from 2012 to 2016. They also have their IRS Form 1023 accessible from 1991, where they applied for recognition of tax exemption. They also have their 501(c)(3) document, containing a letter that confirms their tax exemption status from the Internal Revenue Service. On its website, the charity also has its own printed pamphlet, called "Behind the Numbers" from the years 2013 to 2015. The pamphlet explains what the money in the respective fiscal year was able to accomplish in project works around the world. Charity Navigator gave Water For People a financial score of 93.31/100 and a transparency and accountability score of 100/100.

Partnerships

Water For People partners with local governments, the private sector, and other trusted nongovernmental organizations to support their work. They are also partners with Roberts Filter Group, an American water filter production company, and one of the largest suppliers of water-filtration products and services in the United States. The NGO is not politically nor religiously affiliated, as confirmed by the organization's website and Charity Navigator.

Ratings 
Medium, an online publishing platform, it conducted an investigation on the cost-effectiveness of donating to popular water NGOs in the world today. As it was reporting on the difficulty of investigating NGOs, Medium did a close-up analysis, and among all the water NGO, Water For People provided the most extensive data to the online rating site of its financials and measurable components of impact in the water and sanitation sector. GiveWell, an online organization rating site, conducted a thorough review of water and sanitation organizations in 2011. Water For People declined to give out the very detailed information that Give Well was seeking. Charity Navigator has given Water For People 4 stars out of 4 for the past 15 years. In 2001, the NGO got 3 stars instead.

References

External links
 
 American Water Works Association

Non-profit organizations based in Colorado
Water security
Organizations based in Denver
Organizations established in 1991
Water-related charities
Water organizations in the United States
1991 establishments in Colorado